Dean's Beauty Salon and Barber Shop is a historic business and commercial building located in the Eliot neighborhood of Portland, Oregon, United States. Organized in 1954 and purpose-built in 1956, it is one of the relatively few Black-owned businesses to survive the upheavals of urban renewal, disinvestment, and gentrification that decimated the Black business district in lower Albina starting in the 1960s. It represents the history of African American entrepreneurship in the Albina area and the importance of the hair care industry in African American culture, and became an important gathering place for the Black community. As of 2021, it is the oldest continuously operated Black-owned business in Oregon.

The building was entered on the National Register of Historic Places in 2022.

See also
National Register of Historic Places listings in Northeast Portland, Oregon

References

External links

African American Resources in Portland, Oregon, from 1851 to 1973 MPS, National Register of Historic Places cover documentation
Oregon Historic Sites Database entry

1954 establishments in Oregon
African-American history in Portland, Oregon
Barber shops
Black-owned companies of the United States
Commercial buildings completed in 1956
Commercial buildings on the National Register of Historic Places in Oregon
Eliot, Portland, Oregon
National Register of Historic Places in Portland, Oregon
Northeast Portland, Oregon